YP may refer to:
 YP (rapper), (born Pio Misa), Australian rapper and part of Australian drill and rap group Onefour
 Yard patrol boat, a type of training craft, by US Navy hull classification symbol
 Yellow Pages (computing), former name of the Network Information Service protocol
 Yersinia pestis, a bacterium that causes plague and the "Black Death" epidemic
 YP.com, an online local business directory
 Yurt Partisi, the Homeland Party in Turkey
 YP-, prefix for Yepp player names, such as the YP-55
 Yttrium phosphide, a chemical compound
 Yukon Party, a centre-right political party in Yukon, Canada
 Y P Desert, a desert in Idaho and Nevada in the United States
 The YP Foundation, a charitable trust for young people in India